Kanke  Assembly constituency   is an assembly constituency in  the Indian state of Jharkhand.

Members of Assembly 
2005: Ram Chandra Baitha, Bharatiya Janata Party
2009: Ram Chandra Baitha, Bharatiya Janata Party
2014: Dr. Jitu Charan Ram, Bharatiya Janata Party
2019: Sammari Lal, Bharatiya Janata Party

See also
Vidhan Sabha
List of states of India by type of legislature

References

Assembly constituencies of Jharkhand